Neuberg is a municipality in the Main-Kinzig district, in Hesse, Germany.

References

Municipalities in Hesse
Main-Kinzig-Kreis